Henry Orenstein (born Henryk Orenstein; October 13, 1923 – December 14, 2021) was a Polish-born Jewish-American toymaker, professional poker player, entrepreneur and Holocaust survivor who resided in Verona, New Jersey. A survivor of five Nazi concentration camps and death camps, he emigrated to the United States as a refugee after the war, and later held more than 100 patents, including for the Transformers toyline. He made a fortune as a toy designer and manufacturer, and was inducted into the New Jersey Inventors Hall of Fame. His family includes his niece Lili Bosse, noted philanthropist and former mayor of Beverly Hills, California. 

Orenstein played poker professionally in the US. In 2008, he was inducted into the Poker Hall of Fame because of his consistent record and winnings.

Early life
Henryk Orenstein was born in October 1923, in Hrubieszów, Poland, to a Jewish family. His mother was a homemaker and his father was a grain exporter. Because he was Jewish, he was deported from his town to Nazi concentration camps, surviving five of them. After the war, he emigrated to the United States.  

Orenstein, along with his three brothers and father, had initially fled to Olyka after the German army entered Hrubieszów in September 1939. The Orensteins lived in Olyka for two years before returning to their mother and sister in Hrubieszów. Orenstein explained during interviews that his family had built secret hiding spots between double walls, where they evaded authorities. Finally, having exhausted food and water supplies, they turned themselves in.

His parents were loaded onto trucks with other Jews and taken to a cemetery to be shot to death and buried. He and his siblings were transported to the Budzyń Prison Camp in southeastern General Government (occupied Poland), which was eventually incorporated as a sub-camp into Majdanek concentration camp.  Orenstein and his brothers were also held at Płaszów in southwestern General Government under the infamous Amon Goeth. (He was portrayed in the film Schindler's List.) Orenstein and his brothers were later transferred to Ravensbrück concentration camp in Germany.  

While at Budzyń, Orenstein had heard an announcement over the loudspeaker one day that any scientists should register with the office. Figuring this would be a chance for survival, Orenstein signed up his brother and him, although neither had scientific training. By personal account, Orenstein has said that the Nazi German commanders figured out that some who had registered were not scientists, but went along with the ruse to allow them to remain in so-called "research positions" rather than be drafted into the Nazi German infantry.

Business career
Orenstein and two brothers, Fred and Sam, survived the Holocaust. Their parents were murdered by Nazis in 1942, and their brother, Felix, and sister, Hanka, died during their final days of captivity in separate concentration camps at the end of the war. He emigrated to the United States aboard the SS Marine Flasher, a Type C4-class ship used to transport refugees. He joined their uncle on the Upper West Side of Manhattan. 

Initially finding work with the Libby's canned food company, one day Orenstein noticed a bride doll in a department store window display, on sale for $29.95. (He has said this would be equivalent to $200 in the early 21st century). He decided that he could make one that was more affordable and he became a toy manufacturer. After gaining success with his first dolls, he earned his first million dollars and founded Topper Toys. It produced such well-known toys as the "Suzy Cute" line of miniature dolls and the Johnny Lightning line of model cars.

Orenstein is credited by former Hasbro CEO Alan Hassenfeld as "the catalyst" for the existence of Transformers: the man who convinced Hasbro to buy the Diaclone and Micro Change toys and repackage them as Transformers.  He held more than 100 other patents. Aside from Transformers, the best-known of these inventions is U.S. Patent 5,451,054: a device to detect and display hole cards in poker games.

Poker
In a bid to make televised poker championships more interesting for the audience, Orenstein devised a way in which the players' face-down cards could be seen by the audience: by cutting a window into the tables at each player and having a piece of glass with a camera under it, the audience would be able to better appreciate the game play, while not disturbing the setting for the players.  NBC Sports President of Programming Jon Miller said that Orenstein is "single handedly responsible for the success of poker today."

Orenstein was the creator and an executive producer of the Poker Superstars Invitational Tournament on FSN. He also produced the popular TV Show High Stakes Poker, which ran from 2006 to 2007 and 2009 to 2011; old episodes can be seen in the United States on GSN.

As of 2009, Orenstein's live poker tournament winnings exceeded $200,000. He was a 2008 inductee into the Poker Hall of Fame. Orenstein was also inducted into the New Jersey Inventors Hall of Fame.

He won the $5,000 Seven-card stud tournament at the 1996 World Series of Poker (WSOP), earning $130,000 by defeating fourth-place T. J. Cloutier, third-place Cyndy Violette and runner-up Humberto Brenes. Orenstein twice had finished in the money in the $10,000 WSOP no limit Texas hold 'em main event: 12th in 1993 and eighth in 1995.

Orenstein came in seventh in the $2,500 Seven Card Stud event at the 2005 United States Poker Championship. Despite being the oldest competitor (at age 80), he won his first round of NBC's National Heads-Up Poker Championship against one of the best cash-game players in the world, Chip Reese. Orenstein lost in the second round to John Hennigan.

Death
Orenstein died from COVID-19 at a hospital in Livingston, New Jersey, on December 14, 2021, during the COVID-19 pandemic in New Jersey. He was 98 years old.

Books
 I Shall Live: Surviving Against All Odds 1939-1945 (1987), a memoir of his experiences during the Nazi Holocaust and his survival in five concentration camps.
 Abram: The Life of an Israeli Patriot, a biography of Abram Silberstein, who emigrated to Palestine in 1934. He enlisted in the British Army in 1939, rising from the rank of private to major. He was a great help to Ben Gurion.

References

1923 births
2021 deaths
Majdanek concentration camp survivors
People from Verona, New Jersey
Ravensbrück concentration camp survivors
Polish emigrants to the United States
20th-century Polish Jews
Polish poker players
American poker players
American sports businesspeople
American inventors
World Series of Poker bracelet winners
Poker Hall of Fame inductees
Deaths from the COVID-19 pandemic in New Jersey